Lào Cai Airport or Sapa Airport (Vietnamese language: Sân bay Lào Cai, Sân bay Sapa) is a military/civil planned to be constructed in the province of Lào Cai, Vietnam, around 35 km south of Sapa.
The airport will be located in the commune of Cam Cọn, Bảo Yên District.
The Feasibility Study Report was approved by the Prime Minister on October 21, 2021. The project will be invested in a public-private partnership with a total investment of over VND6,948 billion (around US$305 million). The airport will be in accordance with the 4C standards of the International Civil Aviation Organization and be capable of receiving 1.5 million passengers a year.
According to the approved project, the airport will cover an area of 371 hectares. The first phase of the project will need 295.2 hectares, while the second phase will need an additional 75.8 hectares.
The construction will be carried out in two phases. The first phase will start from Q4/2021, the Sapa Airport will meet the 4C standards of the International Civil Aviation Organization, once completed will be capable of process 1.5 million passengers per year.

Notes

External links
Sa Pa Airport approved, to cost $305 mln

Airports in Vietnam
Proposed airports in Vietnam